The 2020 W Series was a planned motor racing championship that was scheduled to be the second W Series season. The championship was to be exclusively open to female racing drivers as a Formula Regional-level racing series.

The planned championship season was cancelled due to the COVID-19 pandemic, and a 10-event eSports league for female racing drivers only was held on the iRacing platform in its place. The league was ultimately won by Beitske Visser.

Driver selection
The top twelve finishers from the 2019 championship were automatically eligible to compete in the 2020 season, leaving eight vacancies in the driver line up. Forty new drivers applied to take part in the season; however, only fourteen of those took part in the first test which took place between 16 and 18 September 2019 at the Circuito de Almería, Spain.

Applications
The following eight drivers competed in the 2019 W Series but did not automatically qualify for 2020:

  Sarah Bovy
  Megan Gilkes
  Esmee Hawkey
  Shea Holbrook
  Vivien Keszthelyi
  Gosia Rdest
  Naomi Schiff
  Caitlin Wood

The following eight drivers attempted to qualify for the 2020 W Series, having not competed in 2019 but were unsuccessful or elected not to race in W Series:

  Courtney Crone
  Michelle Gatting
  Hannah Grisham
  Chelsea Herbert
  Anna Inotsume
  Gabriela Jílková
  Katherine Legge
  Abbie Munro

Qualified drivers

Calendar
The series was scheduled to continue supporting the 2020 Deutsche Tourenwagen Masters for most races. Races at Hockenheimring, Circuit Zolder and Misano World Circuit were replaced by races at Igora Drive, Anderstorp Raceway and Autodromo Nazionale di Monza. On 16 January 2020, the series announced it would stage races in the Americas, operating as a support category for the United States and Mexico City Grands Prix. On 4 June 2020, the series announced that it would not hold on-track races for the 2020 season, with Formula 1 Managing Director of Motorsports, Ross Brawn, stating "It is a big disappointment for all of us that due to the difficulties presented by COVID-19 the events will not take place."

Esports League
The inaugural season of the W Series Esports League virtual championship was announced on 7 May 2020, with all 18 drivers who qualified to race in the on-track championship taking part in the sim racing series. The league partnered with Logitech G, Beyond Entertainment, and iRacing to bring 27 virtual races to 10 circuits with all drivers competing in digital versions of the Tatuus Formula Renault 2.0 race car. Visser clinched the championship title in 9 rounds ahead of Silverstone, winning 11 races and achieving pole position 12 times.

References

External links
 Official website

W Series
W Series
W Series (championship)
W Series
W